Rheden is a railway station located in Rheden, Netherlands. The station was opened in 1882 and is located on the Arnhem–Leeuwarden railway. The station is currently operated by Nederlandse Spoorwegen. The station closed on 2 October 1927 and reopened on 18 May 1952. The platforms are not located opposite each other, but on either side of the level crossing.

Train services

Bus services

External links
NS website 
Dutch Public Transport journey planner 

Railway stations in Gelderland
Railway stations opened in 1882
Railway stations on the Staatslijn A
Railway stations on the IJssellijn
Rheden